Komi Biova Akakpo (born 31 December 1995), commonly known as Agarawa, is a Togolese professional footballer who last played as a defensive midfielder for Myanmar National League club Chin United.

Career
Akakpo started his career at Agaza before playing with Anges FC in the 2014 Togolese Championnat National. During this time, he was called up to the Togo under-20 national team for the 2015 African U-20 Championship Qualifiers.

At the end of 2016, he signed with Rakhine United for the 2017 Myanmar National League season. He continued with them for the 2018 season and was selected to play in the MNL All-Stars team in their match against Leeds United in Yangon. 

He returned to Myanmar for the 2020 Myanmar National League, where he captained Chin United.

Career statistics

Club

References

1995 births
Living people
Association football midfielders
Rakhine United F.C. players
Togolese footballers
Myanmar National League players